The Lithuania national under-21 football team is the national under-21 football team of Lithuania and is controlled by the Lithuanian Football Federation.

UEFA U-21 Championship record

Recent results

Players

Current squad
 The following players were called-up for the 2022 Under-21 Baltic Cup matches.
 Match dates: 16 and 20 November 2022
 Opposition:  and 
 Caps and goals correct as of: 27 September 2022, after the match against

Recent call-ups
The following players have been called up within the last twelve months and remain available for selection.

List of managers

See also
 Lithuania national football team

References

External links
 UEFA Under-21 website

European national under-21 association football teams
under-21